The 2000 Phillips 66 Big 12 men's basketball tournament was the postseason men's basketball tournament for the Big 12 Conference. It was played from March 9–12 at Kemper Arena in Kansas City, Missouri. No. 1 seed Iowa State defeated Oklahoma 70–58 to win the championship and receive the Big 12’s automatic bid to the 2000 NCAA tournament.

Seeding
The Tournament consisted of a 12 team single-elimination tournament with the top 4 seeds receiving a bye.

Schedule

Bracket

* Denotes overtime period

All-Tournament Team
Most Outstanding Player – Marcus Fizer, Iowa State

See also
2000 Big 12 Conference women's basketball tournament
2000 NCAA Division I men's basketball tournament
1999–2000 NCAA Division I men's basketball rankings

References

Big 12 men's basketball tournament
Tournament
Big 12 men's basketball tournament
Big 12 men's basketball tournament
College sports tournaments in Missouri